The Townsville Fire are an Australian professional female basketball team competing in the Women's National Basketball League (WNBL). They are the only female professional sporting team of any discipline in the northern half of Australia. The team was established in 2001 by Townsville Basketball Inc. In 2014, James Cook University became the team's principal partner and naming rights sponsor.

Following the 2010/11 season, the Fire were seemingly doomed, folding under the weight of financial pressures before an 11th hour resurrection. Prior to the 2011/12 season, the team became a not-for-profit, community owned entity. The Fire reached four straight WNBL Grand Finals between 2012/13 and 2015/16, winning back-to-back championships in 2015 and 2016. Their victory in March 2015 was the city's maiden national premiership. The Fire returned to the WNBL Grand Final in 2017/18 and won their third title in four years.

Season-by-season records

Players

Current roster

Former players
 Gina Stevens, (2002–2004)
 Jodie Datson, (2002–05)
 Natalie Porter, (2004–2006)
 Rachael McCully, (2004–2007, 2008–2015)
 Rohanee Cox, (2005–2010)
 Jennifer Crouse, (2005–2009)
 Kelly Wilson, (2005–2008, 2016–2018)
 Aneka Kerr, (2008–2010)
 Jo Hill, (2009–2011)
 Nadeen Payne, (2010–2012)
 Shanavia Dowdell, (2011–2012)
 Jessica Foley, (2011–2013)
 Suzy Batkovic, (2013–2019)

Coaches and staff

Owners
 Townsville Fire Limited (2011–present)

Head coaches

References

External links
 Townsville Fire official website

 
Women's National Basketball League teams
Sport in Townsville
Basketball teams in Queensland
Basketball teams established in 2001
Articles containing video clips